Pterosaurs included the largest flying animals ever to have lived. They are a clade of prehistoric archosaurian reptiles closely related to dinosaurs. Species among pterosaurs occupied several types of environments, which ranged from aquatic to forested. Below are the lists that comprise the smallest and the largest pterosaurs known .

Smallest pterosaurs 
The specimen found may be a juvenile or a subadult, however, and adults may have been larger.

Pterosaurs with largest wingspan 

This is a list of pterosaurs with estimated maximum wingspan of more than 5 meters (16 feet):
 Hatzegopteryx thambema 
Quetzalcoatlus northopi 
 Cryodrakon boreas 
 Undescribed specimen from Mongolia 
 Thanatosdrakon amaru 
 Arambourgiania philadelphiae 
 Tropeognathus mesembrinus 
 Pteranodon longiceps 
 Thapunngaka shawi 
 Alanqa saharica 
 Santanadactylus araripensis 
 Cearadactylus atrox 

Only a fragmentary rhamphorhynchid specimen from Germany could be larger (184 % the size of the biggest Rhamphorhynchus).

Speculation about pterosaur size and flight 

Some species of pterosaurs grew to very large sizes and this has implications for their capacity for flight. Many pterosaurs were small but the largest had wingspans which exceeded . This indicates that the largest pterosaurs may have had higher wing loadings than modern birds (depending on wing profile) and this has implications for the manner in which pterosaur flight might differ from that of modern birds.

Factors such as the warmer climate of the Mesozoic or higher levels of atmospheric oxygen have been proposed but it is now generally agreed that even the largest pterosaurs could have flown in today's skies. Partly, this is due to the presence of air sacs in their wing membranes, and that pterosaurs launched into flight using their front limbs in a quadrupedal stance similar to that of modern bats, a method faster and less energy taxing than the bipedal launching of modern birds.

See also 

 List of pterosaur genera
 Timeline of pterosaur research
 Smallest organisms
 Largest prehistoric animals
 Dinosaur size

References

External links
 

Pterosaurs
Animal size